Craveggia is a comune (municipality) in the Province of Verbano-Cusio-Ossola in the Italian region Piedmont, located about  northeast of Turin and about  north of Domodossola, on the border with Switzerland.

Craveggia borders the following municipalities: Malesco, Onsernone (Switzerland), Re, Santa Maria Maggiore, Toceno, Vergeletto (Switzerland), Villette.

Demographic evolution

References